The Bourbince is an  long river in the Saône-et-Loire département, in central eastern France. Its source is at Montcenis. It flows generally southwest. It is a left tributary of the river Arroux into which it flows at Digoin.

Communes along its course
The Bourbince flows through the following communes, ordered from source to mouth: Montcenis, Torcy, Les Bizots, Saint-Eusèbe, Blanzy, Montceau-les-Mines, Saint-Vallier, Pouilloux, Ciry-le-Noble, Génelard, Palinges, Saint-Aubin-en-Charollais, Volesvres, Vitry-en-Charollais, Paray-le-Monial, Saint-Léger-lès-Paray, Digoin.

References

External links 
 

Rivers of Bourgogne-Franche-Comté
Rivers of France
Rivers of Saône-et-Loire